Susan Mohl Powers (born 1944 in Saint Paul, Minnesota) is a contemporary artist who sculpts in polygon and planar metal as well as sewn fabric, blending art and science to design sculptures and fabric-on-canvas paintings. The owner of Sailshade Studios in Fall River, Massachusetts, she has designed, trademarked and fabricated an energy-efficient window shade.

Biography 
Susan Mohl Powers, daughter of Judson Jasper Mohl and Florence (née Kling) Mohl, was born in Saint Paul, Minnesota, of Swedish ancestry. Her family lived in Kansas and also in New England, where she completed high school.

Her interests in science and mathematics shaped her approaches to art. As a child she was fascinated by fossils; as an undergraduate, she conducted public open houses at Mount Holyoke College observatory. Powers was also a science teacher at a private school in Minnesota. Her early artistic influences included Buckminster Fuller and D’Arcy Wentworth Thompson's On Growth and Form.

She married Alan W. Powers in 1966. They live in Westport, Massachusetts.

Education 

Powers earned a baccalaureate in 1966 from Mount Holyoke College, having studied studio art, physics, and astronomy. She began her Master of Fine Arts in sculpture at the University of Minnesota, and completed a Master of Fine Arts in visual design in Massachusetts. She studied with Henry Rox, Jānis Kalmīte, Hui Ming Wang, Leonard DeLonga, and Harold Pattek. Early in her career, she created welded steel sculptures under Katherine Nash, who founded Katherine E. Nash Gallery at the University of Minnesota.

Powers has written that her art is an effort to record imagery from scientific studies and observations: "I now see cellular and fossil-like forms everywhere. The expression might be a fabric sculpture. It might be an oil painting in which ribbed structures are sewn into the canvas before stretching. It might be works on paper; when I draw pastel nudes, the thighs, the breasts, and the torsos all break apart into geometric, refracted patterns of the expanding universe."

Reception 

Powers' fine art abstracts and commercial fabrications have been well received. A 1979 New York Times reviewer wrote that some modern artists are "able to create successful mixtures of science and art. The mixtures by Susan Mohl Powers, now on view at the Squibb Gallery, are fascinating, relying heavily on both disciplines for their expression." Acknowledging that a few pieces "might not be eminent successes", the review described most of her pieces as "striking for their adventurousness and for their emphatic presence... What makes these pieces interesting from an esthetic point of view is their apparent contradictory nature. One look might tell us that they are an Expressionist canvas using geometric shapes as imagery. Another look might tell us that they are soft sculpture. In fact, they work well as both."

A review in the Boston Globe described her solo installation of soft sculptures at the Nemasket Gallery in Fairhaven as "a series of gauzy, boxy fabric shapes suspended from the ceiling and moving gracefully in the air currents". It also highlighted her commercial ventures with Sailshades, and commented she "capitalized on the big open space by creating a series of sewn rectangles that, when hanging, stay open without folding or flopping, even though there is no armature other than the seams". The review mentioned layers of translucent materials and stitching lines: "The effect can resemble crazy quilt patterns, or ice floes cracking apart."

A 2003 review observed, "Referencing skeletons and membranes and animals and insects, her suspended works appear to float weightlessly despite their sometimes-large size and volume", and noted that sections of a wall piece "appear to freeze differing fragments of cascading liquid waves movement".

Collaborations 
As a subcontractor for Paul Amaral, Powers fabricated the  tuft for Claes Oldenburg and Coosje van Bruggen's Venice biennial piece, "Lion's Tale", a gift Oldenburg and van Bruggen installed originally May–October, 1999, in Piazza San Marco outside Museo Correr, Venice, Italy (now at Musei Civici Veneziani in Venice). Powers directly collaborated with Paul Amaral in 2014 to fabricate the  perforated stainless steel sculpture, "Dancing Galaxies".

Powers collaborated on three public sculpture installations with architect Kathryn Duff of the Studio to Sustain, Inc., of New Bedford, Massachusetts: at Butler Hospital in Providence, Rhode Island; Prima Care in Fall River, Massachusetts; and The Incognito restaurant in New Bedford, Massachusetts.

In collaboration with her husband, who wrote Birdtalk: Conversations with Birds, Powers provided chapter drawings to help readers identify birds whose calls are being described.

Sailshade Studios 

Powers designed and began fabricating an energy-efficient "insulating decorator roman shade with a self-creating valance" out of her home in 1979, trademarking the name and design Sailshade in 1984 with her husband under the business name "Cloth Construction Partnership".  By 1987, with diminishing sales, Powers took a job at a fabric mill and joined the International Ladies Garment Workers Union, which she later saluted with a large installation, "Under the Microscope of Spirit–A Tribute To The I.L.G.W.U.", at Nemasket Gallery in Fairhaven, Massachusetts.

In 1991 she opened Sailshade Studios, Inc., in Durfee Union Mills, a granite 1860 textile mill complex in Fall River, Massachusetts.Powers has installed Sailshades in 32 states, created applications to address acoustic challenges, and installed heat-reducing "planar net artwork" in other venues. She has also conducted do-it-yourself workshops locally in Massachusetts on making insulated shades that cut energy costs. The Sailshade trademark was re-registered in 2008 under "Sailshade Studios, Inc."

Exhibitions and installations 
Powers' résumé includes solo and group exhibitions, as well as public installations.

Solo exhibitions 
 1979 — "Polygons and Planar Nets," Squibb Gallery, Princeton, New Jersey
 1988 — "Under the Microscope of Spirit–A Tribute To The I.L.G.W.U.", Nemasket Gallery, Fairhaven, Massachusetts; with immediate follow-up exhibition at Heritage State Park, Fall River, Massachusetts
 1994 — Digital Corporation, Worcester, Massachusetts
 1994 — Piano Mill Gallery, Needham, Massachusetts
 1995 — Sterling Millworks Gallery, Sterling, Massachusetts
 2002 — "Solo Exhibition 2002", Galleria Eclettica, Milano, Italia
 2004 — New Bedford Art Museum, Lower Vault and Upper Vault Gallery

Selected group exhibitions 

 1971 — Kramer Gallery, St. Paul, Minnesota
 1975 — Image Gallery, Lenox, Massachusetts
 1994 — Donovan Gallery, Tiverton, Rhode Island
 1998 — Virginia Lynch Gallery, Tiverton, Rhode Island
  2003 — "Sun Spots 2003" and "Juno's Corset 2003", Grimshaw Gudewicz Art Gallery, Fall River, Massachusetts
  2005 — Annotazioni d’Arte, Milano, Italia

Public installations 
 1991−1997— Children’s Hospital, Boston, Massachusetts
 1984 — Banners for Boston Ballet’s world premiere performance of Choo San Goh’s Romeo and Juliet, Wang Center, Boston, Massachusetts
 1994−2008 — Fall River Government Center, Fall River, Massachusetts
 2003 — "Seahorses 2003", Prima Care Lobby, Fall River, Massachusetts
 2004−2008 — Incognito restaurant, New Bedford, Massachusetts
 2004−present — "Fifteen Walls of Bas Reliefs", Butler Hospital, Providence, Rhode Island
 2006−2009 — The Back Eddy restaurant, Westport, Massachusetts
 2009 — Children’s National Medical Center, Washington, D.C.
 2010−2012 — Fall River Planning Board, Fall River, Massachusetts

Selected sculptures by Susan Mohl Powers

References

External links 
 Sailshade Studios
 SMP Installations

1944 births
20th-century American printmakers
20th-century American sculptors
20th-century American women artists
21st-century American sculptors
21st-century American women artists
Abstract expressionist artists
Abstract sculptors
American people of Swedish descent
American women in business
American women printmakers
American women sculptors
Living people
Mount Holyoke College alumni
Sculptors from Massachusetts
University of Minnesota alumni